Renfrow is a town in Grant County, Oklahoma, United States. The population was 12 at the 2010 census, a decline of 33.3 percent from the figure of 16 at the 2000 census.

Geography
Renfrow is located at  (36.925209, -97.655508).

Demographics

As of the census of 2000, there were 16 people, 8 households, and 4 families residing in the town. There were 10 housing units at an average density of 101.8 per square mile (38.6/km2). The racial makeup of the town was 100.00% White.

There were 8 households, out of which none had children under the age of 18 living with them, 50.0% were married couples living together, and 50.0% were non-families. 37.5% of all households were made up of individuals, and 12.5% had someone living alone who was 65 years of age or older. The average household size was 2.00 and the average family size was 2.75.

In the town, the population was spread out, with 31.3% from 25 to 44, 37.5% from 45 to 64, and 31.3% who were 65 years of age or older. The median age was 64 years. For every 100 females, there were 100.0 males. For every 100 females age 18 and over, there were 100.0 males.

The median income for a household in the town was $53,750, and the median income for a family was $53,750. Males had a median income of $80,488 versus $11,875 for females. The per capita income for the town was $20,674. None of the population and none of the families were below the poverty line.

See also
List of towns in Oklahoma

References

Towns in Grant County, Oklahoma
Towns in Oklahoma